Gabrielle Brooks (born 28 January 1990) is an English actress. She was nominated for a Laurence Olivier Award for her performance in Get Up, Stand Up! The Bob Marley Musical. She began her career as a child actress in Andrew Lloyd Webber's Whistle Down the Wind. She is creative director of the Mawa Theatre Company and producer of the interview series BlackStage UK.

Life and career
Brooks was born and raised in London. She is half Jamaican, half Guyanese. She has two sisters. She attended Sir George Monoux College in Walthamstow before going on to train at the Liverpool Institute for Performing Arts, graduating with a Bachelor of Arts in 2011.

Brooks became interested in acting when her parents enrolled her in an after school acting programme. She got her first role at the age of 7 through her teacher's agency in Andrew Lloyd Webber's Whistle Down the Wind at Aldwych Theatre.

Filmography

Stage

Awards and nominations

References

External links

Living people
1990 births
21st-century English actresses
Actresses from London
Alumni of the Liverpool Institute for Performing Arts
Black British actresses
British documentary film producers
English child actresses
English musical theatre actresses
English people of Guyanese descent
English people of Jamaican descent
English Shakespearean actresses
English stage actresses
People educated at Sir George Monoux College
Theatre practitioners